McCuaig is a surname. Notable people with the surname include:

Bradley McCuaig (born 1970), Canadian sprinter
Duncan Fletcher McCuaig (1889–1950), Canadian politician
Duncan John McCuaig (1882–1960), Canadian politician
James Simeon McCuaig (1819–1888), Canadian politician
Ronald McCuaig (1908-1993), Australian poet
Scott McCuaig (born 1984), Canadian football player
Stanley Harwood McCuaig (1891–1986), Canadian lawyer

See also
Marg McCuaig-Boyd (born 1952), Canadian politician